Developer may refer to:

Computers
Software developer, a person or organization who develop programs/applications
Video game developer, a person or business involved in video game development, the process of designing and creating games
Web developer, a programmer who specializes in, or is specifically engaged in, the development of World Wide Web applications

Other uses
Developer (album), the fifth album by indie rock band Silkworm
Photographic developer, chemicals that convert the latent image to a visible image
In real estate development, one who builds on land or alters the use of an existing building for some new purpose

See also

Game designer
Developer! Developer! Developer!, a series of community conferences aimed at software developers